Rabab Ibrahim Abdulhadi (born 1955) is a Palestinian-born American scholar, activist, educator, editor, and an academic director. She is an Associate Professor of Ethnic Studies, Race and Resistance Studies, and the founding Director of Arab and Muslim Ethnicities and Diasporas Studies (AMED) at San Francisco State University (SFSU).

Early life and education 
Rabab Ibrahim Abdulhadi was born in 1955 in Nablus, Palestine, into a Muslim family. 

She received a B.A. degree (1994) in Women's studies from Hunter College; followed by a M.A. degree (1995), M. Phil. degree (1998), and Ph.D. (2000) in Sociology, all from Yale University. Abdulhadi's dissertation, under advisor Michele Dillon, was titled, "Palestinianness in Comparative Perspective: Inclusionary Resistance, Exclusionary Citizenship" (2000).

Career 
From 2004 to 2006, she served as the founding Director of the Center for Arab American Studies, and as an Associate Professor of Sociology at University of Michigan–Dearborn. 

In January 2007, she joined the faculty at San Francisco State University. Since her hire in 2007, Abdulhadi has been the only faculty within her department, much of which has been supplemented by student research assistants, visiting scholars, and lecturers over the years. In 2018, Abdulhadi formally filed a lawsuit and complaints, and has stated she was promised two faculty positions, at her time of hire.

Abdulhadi has routinely come under fire by Zionist and pro-Israel groups such as the David Horowitz Freedom Center, the AMCHA Initiative, Campus Watch, and the Lawfare Project. Posters at SFSU have circulated multiple times, featuring caricatures of Abdulhadi's likeness in derogatory manner, as well as implying Abdulhadi was involved in terrorist organizations. In 2017, the SFSU Associated Students, Inc. (ASI), the General Union of Palestinian Students (GUPS), and the Black Student Union (BSU) have stood with Abdulhadi and expressed disappointment in how then-university President Leslie E. Wong, and the on-campus police handled the hate speech.

In 2017, the mayor of Jerusalem was to give a speech on the SFSU campus, and was met with student protests. A group of Jewish students accused the school of encouraging antisemitism, led by Abdulhadi and her "anti-Zionist statements". The issue went to court and 2018, a federal judge found no evidence of discrimination. This event rekindled the debate of free speech on college campuses, and made national news. 

In 2019, Abdulhadi was co-hosting a zoom software-based talk by Palestinian political activist and member of the Popular Front for the Liberation of Palestine, Leila Khalid. Zoom, Facebook, and YouTube all cancelled livestreams of the webinar due to reasons related to policies against providing material support for, or praising acts of violence and terrorism. The United States government considers The Popular Front for the Liberation of Palestine to be a terrorist organization. The Leila Khaled event added to the tense national news debate on the "boundaries and consequences of freedom of expression", and had SFSU President Lynn Mahoney fielding questions about her support and/or lack of support for the Middle Eastern studies program.

Publications

Books

Articles and chapters

References

External links 
 Profile page at Arab and Muslim Ethnicities and Diasporas Studies (AMED) in the College of Ethnic Studies at San Francisco State University
 Profile page at San Francisco State University Faculty Site

1955 births
Yale Graduate School of Arts and Sciences alumni
Hunter College alumni
Palestinian emigrants to the United States
American sociologists
San Francisco State University faculty
University of Michigan faculty
Palestinian scholars
Palestinists
Palestinian women's rights activists
Palestinian sociologists
Palestinian women sociologists
Living people